The list of non-marine molluscs of Zimbabwe is a list of freshwater and land species that form a part of the molluscan fauna of Zimbabwe (wildlife of Zimbabwe).

Freshwater gastropods 

Ampullariidae
 Lanistes ovum Peters, 1845

Viviparidae
 Bellamya capillata (Frauenfeld, 1865)

Thiaridae
 Melanoides tuberculata (O. F. Müller, 1774)

Planorbidae
 Biomphalaria pfeifferi (Krauss, 1848)
 Bulinus forskalii (Ehrenberg, 1831)
 Bulinus globosus (Morelet, 1866)
 Bulinus tropicus (Krauss, 1848)
 Bulinus truncatus (Audouin, 1827)
 Ceratophallus natalensis (F. Krauss, 1848)
 Gyraulus costulatus (Krauss, 1848)
 Physa acuta (Draparnaud, 1805)
 Planorbella duryi (Wetherby, 1879)

Lymnaeidae
 Pseudosuccinea columella (Say, 1817)
 Radix natalensis (Krauss, 1848)

Land gastropods 

Succineidae
 Oxyloma patentissima (Pfeiffer, 1853)

Urocyclidae
 Polytoxon robustum (Simroth, 1896)

Freshwater bivalves

See also 
Lists of molluscs of surrounding countries:

 List of non-marine molluscs of South Africa
 List of non-marine molluscs of Botswana
 List of non-marine molluscs of Zambia
 List of non-marine molluscs of Mozambique

References 

Lists of biota of Zimbabwe
Zimbabwe
Zimbabwe